Salve Johannessøn Kallevig (1732 – 4 February 1794) was a Norwegian businessperson. He is best known for founding the trading and shipping company Salve Kallevig & Søn in 1792, which was largely expanded by his son Morten Michael Kallevig. The company was passed down through the generations, and existed until 1962.

References

External links
 The family tree of Salve Johannessen Kallevig on Geni.com

1732 births
1794 deaths
People from Arendal
Norwegian company founders